"Dio portes echi i zoi" (Greek: Δύο πόρτες έχει η ζωή), sometimes billed as "Tora pou fevgo ap' ti zoi" or "To telefteo vrady mou", is a Greek-language song (Laïko) performed by popular Greek singers Stelios Kazantzidis and Marinella. The lyrics are by Eftichia Papagianopoulos and the music is by Kazantzidis himself. The song was first released on 78 rpm vinyl record in 1959 by His Master's Voice in Greece. The record also contained the song "Madhubala" and sold about 100,000 pieces in its year of release, beating the previous record of 45,000 record sales that Hadjidakis song "Garifallo st' afti" had set.

Personnel
 Stelios Kazantzidis - vocals, arranger, conductor
 Marinella - background vocals
 His Master's Voice - producer

Lyrics

Greek original

Transliteration
To teleftaío vrádi mouapópse to pernáoki ósoi me píkranan polí,tóra pou fev́go ap’ ti zoí,ólous tous sighornáo.

Óla eínai éna pséma,mia anása, mia pnoḯ,sa louloúdi kápoio héritha más kópsi mian avyí.

Ekí pou páo den pernáto dákri kai o pónos.Ta vásana kai oi kaïmoíedó tha mínoun sti zoíki egó tha fígo mónos.

Óla eínai éna pséma,mia anása, mia pnoḯ,sa louloúdi kápoio héritha más kópsi mian avyí.

Dio pórtes éhei i zoí.Ánoixa mia kai bíka.Seryiánisa éna proinóki óspou na ’rthi to dilinó,apó tin álli vyíka.

Óla eínai éna pséma,mia anása, mia pnoḯ,sa louloúdi kápoio héritha más kópsi mian avyí.

Translation
My last nightis tonightand those who have hurt me a lotnow that I’m leaving this lifeI forgive them all.

Everything is a liea breath, a sighlike a flower, someone’s handwill cut us, one day.

Where I’m going, there are notears and painno worries, no sorrow.They will stay here, in this lifeand I’ll leave alone.

Everything is a liea breath, a sighlike a flower, someone’s handwill cut us, one day.

Life has two doors.I opened one and entered.Οne morning I went for a walkand till the nightfall,I came out through the other door.

Everything is a liea breath, a sighlike a flower, someone’s handwill cut us, one day.

References

External links

Stelios Kazantzidis songs
Marinella songs
Greek songs
1959 songs